The Tenterfield Star, also published as The Tenterfield Star and New England Chronicle and The Tenterfield Record and Border Advertiser, is a semi-weekly English language newspaper published in Tenterfield, New South Wales, Australia.

History 
Publication of The Tenterfield Star began 10 August 1871, published by Duncan M'Master Cameron. It continues The Tenterfield Star and New England Chronicle, published by Christopher Bentley, and absorbed The Tenterfield Record and Border Advertiser, published by Frederick Samuel Grey from 16 January 1885 until approximately 1890.

The Tenterfield Star was owned and operated in the late 1890s by Major J.F. Thomas, the solicitor who defended Harry "Breaker" Morant. The newspaper also played a part during this period in the Federation of Australia.

The Tenterfield Star celebrated its 140th anniversary in 2010.

See also 
 List of newspapers in Australia
 List of newspapers in New South Wales

References

External links 
Tenterfield Star (official website)

Newspapers published in New South Wales
Publications established in 1871